An active Brownian particle (ABP) is a model of self-propelled motion in a dissipative environment. It is a nonequilibrium generalization of a Brownian particle.

The self-propulsion results from a force that acts on the particle's center of mass and points in the direction of an intrinsic body axis (the particle orientation). It is common to treat particles as spheres, though other shapes (such as rods) have also been studied. Both the center of mass and the direction of the propulsive force are subjected to white noise, which contributes a diffusive component to the overall dynamics. In its simplest version, the dynamics is overdamped and the propulsive force has constant magnitude, so that the magnitude of the velocity is likewise constant (speed-up to terminal velocity is instantaneous).

The term active Brownian particle usually refers to this simple model and its straightforward extensions, though some authors have used it for more general self-propelled particle models.

Equations of motion 
Mathematically, an active Brownian particle is described by its center of mass coordinates  and a unit vector  giving the orientation. In two dimensions, the orientation vector can be parameterized by the 2D polar angle , so that . The equations of motion in this case are the following stochastic differential equations:

where

with  the 2×2 identity matrix.

The dynamics can also be described in terms of a probability density function , which gives the probability, at time , of finding a particle at position  and with orientation . By averaging over the stochastic trajectories from the equations of motion,  can be shown to obey the following partial differential equation:

Behavior 

For an isolated particle far from boundaries, the combination of diffusion and self-propulsion produces a stochastic (fluctuating) trajectory that appears ballistic over short length scales and diffusive over large length scales. The transition from ballistic to diffusive motion is defined by a characteristic length , called the persistence length.

In the presence of boundaries or other particles, more complex behavior is possible. Even in the absence of attractive forces, particles tend to accumulate at boundaries. Obstacles placed within a bath of active Brownian particles can induce long-range density variations and nonzero currents in steady state.

Sufficiently concentrated suspensions of active Brownian particles phase separate into a dense and dilute regions. The particles' motility drives a positive feedback loop, in which particles collide and hinder each other's motion, leading to further collisions and particle accumulation. At a coarse-grained level, a particle's effective self-propulsion velocity decreases with increased density, which promotes clustering. In the more general context of self-propelled particle models, this behavior is known as motility-induced phase separation. It is a type of athermal phase separation because it occurs even if the particles are spheres with hard-core (purely repulsive) interactions.

Variations
A variant of active Brownian motion involves complete directional reversals in addition to rotational diffusion. This movement pattern is seen in bacteria like Myxococcus xanthus, Pseudomonas putida, Pseudoalteromonas haloplanktis, Shewanella putrefaciens, and ''Pseudomonas citronellolis.

See also
 Run-and-tumble motion
 Janus particle
 Langevin equation
 Active matter
 Nonequilibrium statistical mechanics

Notes

Sources

 
 
 
 
 
 
 
 
 
 
 

Stochastic processes